The Pratt Foundation is an Australian philanthropic organisation based in Melbourne and established in 1978 by Jeanne and Richard Pratt.

According to its Values Statement, it has "the shared vision of supporting charitable enterprises and adding value to philanthropy". The Pratt Foundation claims to be one of the largest private sources of philanthropy in Australia. Its chief executive is Melbourne journalist Sam Lipski, and Heloise Waislitz is its chair.

References

External links
 "Philanthropy", Pratt Industries

Foundations based in Australia
1978 establishments in Australia